Samborz  is a village in the administrative district of Gmina Kostomłoty, within Środa Śląska County, Lower Silesian Voivodeship, in south-western Poland. Prior to 1945 it was in Germany, and called Tschammendorf.

The village has a population of 260.

References

Samborz